VII Riigikogu was the seventh legislature of the Estonian Parliament (Riigikogu). The legislature was elected after 1992 election, the first after the Estonian Restoration of Independence.

Election results
Results:

Officers
Speaker of the Riigikogu: Ülo Nugis.
Deputy Speakers of the Riigikogu: Tunne Kelam, Edgar Savisaar

List of members of the Riigikogu

References

Riigikogu